The 2007 Israel Baseball League season was the first season in the history of the Israel Baseball League. In the first game in the IBL's history, the Modi'in Miracle squared off against the Petach Tikva Pioneers at Yarkon Field in Petach Tikva. The Miracle won that game, beating Petach Tikva 9 to 1.

The champions of the 2007 IBL season were the Bet Shemesh Blue Sox. The Blue Sox defeated the Modi'in Miracle 3–0 on August 19, 2007, to win the championship.

Standings

Stats

Batting leaders

Pitching leaders

References
Israel Baseball League home page

Israel Baseball League